Sam Mun Tsai is an area and a village in Yim Tin Tsai, Tai Po District, Hong Kong.

Administration
Sam Mun Tsai is one of the villages represented within the Tai Po Rural Committee. For electoral purposes, Sam Mun Tsai is part of the Shuen Wan constituency, which was formerly represented by So Tat-leung until October 2021. Sam Mun Tsai New Village or Sam Mun Tsai San Tsuen is a recognized village under the New Territories Small House Policy.

History
The fishermen now residing in Sam Mun Tsai New Village used to live on boats at the original Sam Mun Tsai, close to Tai Kau of Luk Heung, now at the northeastern shore of Plover Cove Reservoir. They were relocated to their current residence in 1966, as a result of the construction of the Plover Cove Reservoir. At the time, 36 families were moved to housing on land. Extensive renovation work was conducted at the Sam Mun Tsai Fishermen's Village in 2006-2007.

See also
 Fishermen villages in Hong Kong

References

Villages in Tai Po District, Hong Kong